Kite Man (Charles "Chuck" Brown) is a supervillain appearing in comic books published by DC Comics. He is commonly depicted as an adversary of Batman who uses kite-based weapons to commit crimes. His name is a homage to Peanuts protagonist Charlie Brown. The character has been generally regarded as a joke in comparison with other supervillains, due to his lack of super-powers, dimwitted personality, and the flimsy central concept that believes his identity as a super-criminal.

In recent years, Kite Man has been adapted into several forms of media outside of comics, such as the adult animated series Harley Quinn, in which he is voiced by Matt Oberg. Oberg is set to reprise his role in Noonan's, a spin-off focused on the character.

Publication history
Kite Man first appeared in Batman #133 (August 1960), and was created by writer Bill Finger and artist Dick Sprang. He subsequently appeared in Batman #315 (September 1979) by Len Wein. 

Tony Isabella would use the character in Hawkman #4 (November 1986), and gave him the real name of Charles Brown, as well as introducing the idea that he was a "joke" villain. Following this he was primarily used as a minor character, until Tom King featured him in his run on Batman in the DC Rebirth era.

Fictional character biography
Charles "Chuck" Brown is a man who armed himself with kite weapons to be used to commit acts of evil. He flies with a big kite strapped to himself or in a kite plane. He also uses an array of specialty kites to overwhelm his enemies and commit crimes. 

In his first appearance (which he announces), in Batman #133, he first drops tear gas from his kite to steal a precious ruby then frees mobster Big Bill Collins, nearly killing Robin along the way and capturing Batman. Leaving mobsters to guard Batman's room, on his return Kite Man is defeated when Robin returns, frees Batman and they use his own amazing Kite weapons against him, leaving a Kite Plane trophy on the Batcave wall.   

Writer Len Wein brought him back in a story about payroll heists.

Hawkman, Hawkgirl, and Zatanna confront him again, in Hawkman's title. His real name is revealed, as well as a childhood fascination with kites. He is victorious and jumps into a tree.

Kite Man is one of many criminals to take advantage of the supervillain-friendly atmosphere of the fictional country of Zandia. He ends up joining its sports team and later becomes involved in a fight against an invading troop of superheroes.

In Infinite Crisis, Joker reports that Brown was thrown off Wayne Tower without his kite by Deathstroke, after he refused to join the new Secret Society of Super Villains.

Brown, however, survives his fall and reaches some low rank in the post-Crisis Gotham City's underworld in the pages of the weekly series 52. He is captured alongside Sewer King, Dawson, Lamelle, The Squid and Mirage. As with the other prisoners, Kite Man is killed and eaten by Bruno Mannheim upon refusing to side with him.

DC Rebirth
Kite Man appears in the DC Rebirth universe. This version is referred to as Charles, Chuck, and Charlie Brown. He seems to be happier, constantly chanting the catch-phrase "Kite Man, hell yeah!", a reference to his son, Charles Brown Jr.'s reaction to the first time he tried flying a kite. He first appears robbing a luxurious party, before being quickly foiled by Gotham Girl. He is then seen in a prison cell in Arkham Asylum as Batman walks down the aisles looking for criminals. 

At some point, he escapes, as he is later one of the many villains taken down by Batman and Catwoman after he takes her along with him on an average night of his job in Gotham City. Kite Man later sold a kite to a pawn shop, where Headhunter purchased it to use to kill Swamp Thing's father. Batman and Swamp Thing interrogated Kite Man later.

In a story set during the early years of Batman's career, it is revealed that he studied wind in school. He was a divorced father, became an alcoholic and began a life of criminal activities, eventually being recruited by the Joker to design the Jokermobile. During The War of Jokes and Riddles, he becomes encircled by Batman, who commands him to get the Joker's phone number and, later, to meet him. Shortly after, the Riddler kidnaps Charles, wanting to know about his future meeting with the Joker. After being freed, he is kidnapped again, this time by the Joker, who tells him about his encounters with Batman and the Riddler. He is then forced to serve as a suicide bomber by the Joker to kill Batman, but realizes that the bomb is fake. Charles Brown Jr., his son, is poisoned by the Riddler and subsequently dies. Wanting to get revenge on the Riddler, Charles Brown creates the persona of Kite Man to join the Joker's side.

After Batman joins the Riddler's side on the war he starts to defeat every villain on Joker's side, leaving Kite Man for last. When Kite Man is captured he tells Batman and the Riddler about Joker's last secret hideout on a building and provides them and all the villains on Riddler's side kites so they can infiltrate it. After breaking inside, Riddler and his villains turn against Batman, who tells Kite Man to activate the jet-propelled inverse parachutes in their packs, making the villains ascend to be captured by Alfred Pennyworth in the Bat-Blimp. After a scuffle, the Riddler then reveals that the creation of Kite Man, and his own defeat at Kite Man's hands, was part of an unsuccessful plan to solve the Joker's depression and make him laugh again.

Other versions
In the alternate timeline of the 2011 Flashpoint storyline, Kite Man is one of the many villains killed by that reality's Batman.

In other media

Television
 Kite Man appears in Batman: The Brave and the Bold, voiced by Jeffrey Combs. As a boy, this version was obsessed with Benjamin Franklin and attempted to recreate his famous kite experiment. However, he failed to take adequate safety precautions and the subsequent electrical shock psychologically traumatized him, forcing him into a life of kite-centric crime. In a flashback in the episode "Terror on Dinosaur Island!", he led a group of thieves equipped with high-tech glider kites in a crime spree until he was stopped by Batman, and his former henchman Plastic Man testified against him in court. In the episode "Long Arm of the Law!", Kite Man steals a sample of Plastic Man to complete a theta beam gun that will enable anyone to copy Plastic Man's powers or petrify someone with elastic powers. Kite Man also obtains a sidekick named Rubberneck and stretching powers from theta beam exposure before fighting Batman and Plastic Man until he and Rubberneck end up entangled together and the theta beam gun turns them to stone.
 Additionally, an unnamed, heroic, alternate universe version of Kite Man makes a non-speaking appearance in the episode "Deep Cover for Batman!"
 Kite Man appears as a recurring character in Harley Quinn, voiced by Matt Oberg. This version is a dimwitted but usually well-meaning criminal known for his catchphrase "Kite Man, hell yeah!" and for trying to pick up women. Additionally, he is the son of metahuman parents, Darryl and Wendy Brown, who are disappointed with their son for not having powers like them. During the show's first two seasons, he serves as Poison Ivy's love interest, until he breaks up with her after realizing that Ivy does not truly reciprocate his feelings. As of season three, he has begun dating Golden Glider.
 Noonan's, a spin-off series focusing on Kite Man, is in development for HBO Max.
 Kite Man makes a cameo appearance in the DC Super Hero Girls episode "#LeagueOfShadows".

Film
 Kite Man makes a minor appearance in The Lego Batman Movie.
 James Gunn, director of The Suicide Squad, briefly considered adding Kite Man to the titular team, but eventually decided against it, believing it wasn't "the freshest way to go". However, he remained open to an appearance in a sequel.

Video games
Kite Man appears as a playable character in Lego DC Super-Villains, voiced again by Jeffrey Combs.

See also
 List of Batman family enemies

References

External links
 DCU Guide: Kite Man

Comics characters introduced in 1960
Characters created by Bill Finger
DC Comics male supervillains
DC Comics supervillains
Fictional aviators
Kites
Batman characters